Uttam Kumar Banik (born 12 April 1991) is a Bangladeshi footballer who plays as a defender. He currently plays for Uttar Baridhara Club in the Bangladesh Premier League. He spent the majority of his career with Sheikh Russel KC, before leaving in 2021. He has represented Bangladesh national football team on one occasion in 2011 against Myanmar.

References 

1991 births
Living people
Footballers from Dhaka
Bangladeshi footballers
Bangladesh international footballers
Association football defenders
Bangladeshi Hindus
Uttar Baridhara SC players
Sheikh Russel KC players
Bangladesh Football Premier League players